The Hubballi–Kochuveli Superfast Express is an Express train belonging to South Western Railway zone that runs between  and .It began operations as KOCHUVELI YESWANTHAPUR WEEKLY EXPRESS  express and later extended to Hubbali.It is currently being operated with  07359/07360 train numbers on a weekly basis. It has inconvenient timings and since the day of running is not suitable,It mostly runs empty.

Service

The 12777/Hubballi–Kochuveli Weekly Superfast Express has an average speed of 54 km/hr and covers 1294 km in 23h 45m. The 12778/Kochuveli–Hubballi Weekly Superfast Express has an average speed of 54 km/hr and covers 1294 km in 23h 45m.

Schedule

Route and halts 

The important halts of the train are:

Coach composition

The train has standard ICF rakes with a max speed of 110 kmph. The train consists of 16 coaches:

 1 AC II Tier
 1 AC III Tier
 6 Sleeper coaches
 6 General Unreserved
 2 Seating cum Luggage Rake

Traction

Both trains are hauled by a Krishnarajapuram Loco Shed-based WDM-3A diesel locomotive from Hubballi to Yesvantpur. From Yesvantpur train is hauled by an Erode WAP-4 electric locomotive to Kochuveli and vice versa.

Rake sharing

The train shares its rake with MGR CHENNAI CENTRAL HUBBALLI EXPRESS.

See also 

 Hubli Junction railway station
 Kochuveli railway station
 Hubballi–Lokmanya Tilak Terminus Express (via Bijapur)

Notes

References

External links 

 12777/Hubballi–Kochuveli Weekly SF Express India Rail Info
 12778/Kochuveli–Hubballi Weekly SF Express India Rail Info

Transport in Hubli-Dharwad
Transport in Thiruvananthapuram
Express trains in India
Rail transport in Karnataka
Rail transport in Tamil Nadu
Rail transport in Kerala
Railway services introduced in 2012